The 1996 World's Strongest Man was the 19th edition of World's Strongest Man and was won by Magnús Ver Magnússon from Iceland. This was Magnús' fourth WSM title, tying the record of fellow Icelander Jón Páll Sigmarsson. Riku Kiri from Finland finished second, and Gerrit Badenhorst from South Africa finished third after finishing second the previous year. The contest was held in Port Louis, Mauritius.

Heats

Group 1

Group 2

Group 3

Group 4

Final results

References

External links
 Official site

World's Strongest
World's Strongest Man
Worlds Strongest Man, 1996